2022 Quetta bombing may refer to:

March 2022 Quetta bombing
November 2022 Quetta bombing